The team event at the European Women's Artistic Gymnastics Championships was first held in 1994.

Three medals are awarded: gold for first place, silver for second place, and bronze for third place. Tie breakers have not been used in every year. In the event of a tie between two teams, both teams are listed, and the following position (second for a tie for first, third for a tie for second) is left empty because a medal was not awarded for that position. If three teams tied for a position, the following two positions are left empty.

The teams with the most gold medals and total medals in this event are Romania and Russia. Romania has won seven golds, two silvers, and two bronzes. Russia has won five golds, five silvers, and three bronzes.

Medalists

Medal table

References

European Artistic Gymnastics Championships
All-around artistic gymnastics